Durante is both an Italian surname and a masculine Italian given name. Notable people with the name include:

Surname:
Adriano Durante (1940-2009), Italian professional road bicycle racer
Andrew Durante (born 1982), Australian football (soccer) player
Annalisa Durante (1990–2004), Italian murder victim
Anthony Durante (1967–2003), American professional wrestler
Carlo Durante, Italian paralympic athlete
Charlotte Durante (born 1944), American businesswoman and community activist
Checco Durante (1893–1976), Italian film actor
David Durante (born 1980), American artistic gymnast
Eli Durante, retired Brazilian football (soccer) player
Francesco Durante (1684–1755), Neapolitan composer
Francesco Durante (1844–1934), Italian politician and surgeon

Jimmy Durante (1893–1980), Italian-American entertainer
Margaret Durante (born 1988), American country music singer
Mark Durante, American pedal steel guitarist
Nicandro Durante (born 1956), Brazilian businessman
Richard Durante (born 1930), Canadian politician
Silvestro Durante (died 1672), Italian church musician and composer
Viviana Durante (born 1967), Italian-born English prima ballerina

Given name:
Durante Alberti (1538–1613), Tuscan painter
Durante degli Alighieri a.k.a. Dante Alighieri (1265–1321), Florentine poet

See also

Durante (grape), another name for the Italian wine grape Coda di Volpe
Durant (disambiguation)
Dante (disambiguation), originally a contracted version of Durante
 Duranty

Italian-language surnames
Italian masculine given names